
Gmina Deszczno is a rural gmina (administrative district) in Gorzów County, Lubusz Voivodeship, in western Poland.

Villages
Gmina Deszczno contains the villages and settlements of Białobłocie, Bolemin, Borek, Brzozowiec, Ciecierzyce, Deszczno, Dziersławice, Dzierżów, Glinik, Karnin, Kiełpin, Koszęcin, Krasowiec, Łagodzin, Maszewo, Niwica, Orzelec, Osiedle Poznańskie, Płonica, Prądocin and Ulim.

Neighbouring gminas
Gmina Deszczno is bordered by the city of Gorzów Wielkopolski and by the gminas of Bledzew, Bogdaniec, Krzeszyce, Lubniewice, Santok and Skwierzyna.

Twin towns – sister cities

Gmina Deszczno is twinned with:
 Borkheide, Germany

References

Deszczno
Gorzów County